NH 107 may refer to:

 National Highway 107 (India)
 New Hampshire Route 107, United States